Eddy Grant has released 15 studio albums, 13 compilation albums and 19 singles.  His album Killer on the Rampage peaked at number 10 on the Billboard 200 chart in the US and was certified gold.  His single "Electric Avenue" received Platinum accreditation in the US, and "I Don't Wanna Dance" topped the charts in five countries including Belgium, Ireland and the UK.  In 2001, his ringbang remix of "Electric Avenue" reached number 5 in the UK Singles Chart.

Albums

Studio albums

Live albums

Compilation albums

Singles

References

Grant, Eddy
Grant, Eddy